María Trinidad Castillo Boilet (born 4 October 1956) is a Chilean teacher who was elected as a member of the Chilean Constitutional Convention.

References

External links
 BCN Profile

1956 births
Living people
21st-century Chilean politicians
Members of the Chilean Constitutional Convention
University of La Serena alumni
21st-century Chilean women politicians